Isaac J. "Ike" Rogers was a college football player.

Early years 
Rogers attended the Florence State Normal School in Florence, Alabama.

University of Alabama 
Rogers was a prominent tackle for the Alabama Crimson Tide of the University of Alabama, He was a member of the Sigma Nu fraternity.

1919 
He was captain of the 1919 Alabama team that lost just one game.  Rogers had been previously elected captain, but had to serve in the First World War. He was twice selected All-Southern. In his last game, a 14–6 win over Mississippi A & M, he scored a touchdown on a punt he blocked.

References 

Players of American football from Alabama
Alabama Crimson Tide football players
American football tackles
All-Southern college football players
People from Franklin County, Alabama